Ron James (3 May 1907 – 16 November 1969) was  a former Australian rules footballer who played with Footscray in the Victorian Football League (VFL).

Notes

External links 

1907 births
1969 deaths
Australian rules footballers from Victoria (Australia)
Western Bulldogs players
Eaglehawk Football Club players